John Baldwin, Jr. (born October 18, 1973) is an American retired figure skater. With partner  Rena Inoue, he is a two-time  U.S. national champion. Inoue and Baldwin are the first skaters to perform a throw triple Axel in competition.

Personal life
Baldwin was born in Dallas, Texas. His parents were both skating coaches. His father, John Baldwin Sr., competed as a single skater in the 1960s. His brother Don Baldwin competed in singles as well.

Baldwin attended Poway High School. He proposed to his skating partner Rena Inoue in January 2008. Their first daughter was born in November 2011 and the second four years later.

Baldwin and his father have a used car business, Baldwin Auto Sales, in Escondido, California. In March 2018, they were charged with non-compliance with financial reporting obligations. Their cases were resolved in 2019 after they agreed to pay back taxes, penalties and interest.

Career
John Baldwin originally competed in both singles and pairs. With partner Tristan Colell, he competed at the World Junior Championships.

Baldwin was a veteran single skater, having competed at every national championship from his win at the novice level in 1987 through 2000. His best finish at Nationals as a senior was 9th in 1995. He won the 1995 national gold medal in compulsory figures.

His father, who was a skating coach, arranged a tryout between Baldwin and Rena Inoue, a Japanese skater living in America. Inoue and Baldwin tried out and agreed to form the partnership. They began competing together in 2000.

They placed 11th at the 2001 U.S. Championships. The following season, they won the pewter medal at the 2002 U.S. Championships. They were sent to the 2002 Four Continents, their first international competition together, and placed 7th.

In the 2002–2003 season, Inoue / Baldwin competed on the Grand Prix circuit for the first time. Returning to Nationals, they won the bronze medal. They withdrew from the 2003 Four Continents, but placed 10th at the 2003 World Championships.

In the 2003–2004 season, they improved on their Grand Prix results and won their first national title. They placed 4th at the 2004 Four Continents and repeated their 10th-place finish at the 2004 World Championships.

In the 2004–2005 season, they medalled for the first time on the Grand Prix and qualified for the Grand Prix Final, where they placed 6th. They won the silver medal at the 2005 U.S. Figure Skating Championships and placed 11th at the 2005 World Championships.

In the 2005–2006 season, Inoue / Baldwin medalled on the Grand Prix. At the 2006 U.S. Championships, Inoue and Baldwin became the first pair to successfully perform a throw triple Axel in competition. They went on to the 2006 Four Continents, which they won. At the 2006 Winter Olympics, they made Olympic and international history when they landed the throw triple Axel for the first time in international competition. They placed 7th overall. At the 2006 World Figure Skating Championships, they placed 4th.

In the 2006–2007 season, Inoue / Baldwin won the gold medal at the 2006 Skate America after winning the short program and placing second in the free skate. They won the silver medal at 2006 Skate Canada International the next week; and then won the silver at 2006 Trophée Eric Bompard one week later. They qualified for the Grand Prix Final. While in Saint Petersburg for that competition, Baldwin was abducted, assaulted and robbed, though he and Inoue were still able to compete, and finished fourth. At the 2007 U.S. Championships, they won the silver medal. They placed 8th at the 2007 World Championships.

In the 2007–2008 season, Inoue / Baldwin sat out the Grand Prix series, choosing to skate in shows instead. Returning to competition at the 2008 U.S. Championships, they won the silver medal. While they were taking their bows following their free skate, Baldwin proposed marriage to Inoue on the ice and she accepted. Inoue and Baldwin competed at the 2008 World Championships, where they placed 10th.

Inoue / Baldwin were 5th at the 2008 Skate America and won the silver medal at the 2008 NHK Trophy.

Programs 
(with Inoue)

Competitive highlights
GP: Grand Prix

Pairs career with Inoue

Pairs career with Colell

Singles career

References

External links

 
 
 

1973 births
Living people
American male pair skaters
American male single skaters
Figure skaters at the 2006 Winter Olympics
Olympic figure skaters of the United States
Sportspeople from Dallas
Four Continents Figure Skating Championships medalists
World Junior Figure Skating Championships medalists
20th-century American people
21st-century American people